The Grmovšek Lodge Below Big Kopa Peak (1377 m) is mountain hut under Big Kopa on the westernmost and highest part of Pohorje. The hut was built in 1937 and soon became important for hiking and wintersports. In 1942 it was burnt down, the hikers built new one in 1947, but it was also burnt down the same year. The third hut opened in 1954 and was named after Miloš Grmovšek, the then president of the Slovenj Gradec Hiking Club.

Starting points
1h from the Ribnica Lodge
2h from the village of Dovže

See also
 Slovenian Mountain Hiking Trail

References
 Slovenska planinska pot, Planinski vodnik, PZS, 2012, Milenko Arnejšek - Prle, Andraž Poljanec

External links
 Routes, Description & Photos
 on Planinska zveza

Mountain huts in Slovenia
Pohorje